Dakarella is a Gram-negative genus of bacteria from the family of Sutterellaceae with one known species (Dakarella massiliensis). Dakarella massiliensis has been isolated from the female genital tract.

References

Burkholderiales
Bacteria genera
Monotypic bacteria genera